Pradip Kumar Mohanty (born 10 June 1955) is an Indian attorney and Jurist currently serving as a Judicial Member of Lokpal Committee since 23 March 2019. He will retire from the post till 70 years of age. He is former Chief Justice of the Jharkhand High Court.

Early life and family
Mohanty was born at Cuttack in a Lawyers family. His father, Late Jugal Kishore Mohanty was the Chief Justice of Sikkim High Court and maternal grandfather, Late Rajkishore Das was also a Judge of Orissa High Court. Mohanty studied in the Ravenshaw Collegiate School of Cuttack and graduated from the Ravenshaw College in 1974. He passed Law from Madhusudan Law College of Cuttack.

Career
Mohanty started practice in the Constitutional, Criminal and Civil matters in the Orissa High Court. He was elected as the Secretary of the Orissa High Court Bar Association. He appeared on behalf of various Municipalities and also became the Additional Government Advocate in the High Court. Mohanty was the Special Public Prosecutor in Graham Staines murder case. On 7 March 2002 he was appointed an Additional Judge of the Orissa High Court and thereafter became the Permanent Judge in 2004. He also served as the Acting Chief Justice of the court several times. Mohanty was nominated as Chairman of NSA Advisory Board constituted under National Security Act, 1980. On 7 October 2016 he was transferred to the Jharkhand High Court as Acting Chief Justice. On  24 March 2017, he became the Chief Justice of the Jharkhand High Court. Justice Mohanty retired on 9 June 2017 from the post.

He was appointed Judicial Member of Lokpal Committee on 23 March 2019 along with 3 other Judicial members. On 28 May 2022, He was appointed as the acting Chairperson of the Lokpal after the superannuation of the first Lokpal chairperson Pinaki Chandra Ghose.

References

1955 births
Living people
Indian judges
Judges of the Orissa High Court
Chief Justices of the Jharkhand High Court
Ravenshaw University alumni
20th-century Indian judges
20th-century Indian lawyers
21st-century Indian lawyers
21st-century Indian judges